Mohammad Nawaz (born 21 January 2000), is an Indian professional footballer who plays as a goalkeeper for Indian Super League club Mumbai City.

Club career

FC Goa
Born in Manipur, Nawaz signed with Goa of the Indian Super League after being a part of the India under-17 squad. He played for the club's reserve side in the I-League 2nd Division for the rest of the season.

For the 2018–19 season, Nawaz was promoted to the club's first-team. Nawaz then made his professional debut for the club on 1 October 2018 against NorthEast United. During the match, he handled the ball outside the box which lead to the freekick which gave NorthEast United an early lead in the 8th minute before conceding again in the 53rd. The match ended in a 2–2 draw. Despite the mistake during the match, Goa head coach, Sergio Lobera, started Nawaz again in Goa's next match against the reigning champions Chennaiyin on 6 October 2018. The result this time was better for Goa as they won 3–1, with Nawaz earning the Emerging Player of the Match award. Having played an instrumental role in the FC Goa's successful campaigns in 2018-19 and 2019-20, winning the Super Cup and the League Winners' Shield, Nawaz became a pivotal member of the Gaurs' setup.

Mumbai City
In 2021, Indian Super League defending champions Mumbai City signed a three-year-long deal with Nawaz. He appeared in the 2021–22 season with the club as they finished on fifth position. In April 2022, he was included in the club's 2022 AFC Champions League squad, and made his continental debut in their 1–0 defeat to Emirati side Al Jazira on 14 April.

International
Nawaz was part of the India under-17 side which was preparing for the FIFA U-17 World Cup being hosted in India. Prior to the tournament, it was announced that Nawaz wouldn't be in the 21-man squad but that he would be one of three players still training with the squad during it.

Personal life 
His father works as a driver, and his mother is an anganwadi worker. He is the cousin of Mohammad Yasir.

Career statistics

Club

Honours

Club 
FC Goa
Indian Super Cup: 2019
 Indian Super League Premiers: 2019–20

References

External links 
 Mohammad Nawaz at Indian Super League

2000 births
Living people
People from Manipur
Indian footballers
FC Goa players
Association football goalkeepers
Footballers from Manipur
I-League 2nd Division players
Indian Super League players
India youth international footballers